South Korea competed at the 2005 East Asian Games held in Macao, China from October 29, 2005, to November 6, 2005. South Korea finished third with 32 gold medals, 48 silver medals, and 65 bronze medals.

Medal summary

Medal table

References

East Asian Games
2005 East Asian Games